Robert Short may refer to:

 Bob Short (1917–1982), American sports team owner and politician
 Bobby Short (1924–2005), American cabaret singer and pianist
 Rob Short (born 1972), Canadian field hockey player
 Robert Short (East India Company officer) (1783–1859), British officer in the Honourable East India Company
 Robert L. Short (1932–2009), American clergyman and writer
 Robert McCawley Short (1904–1932), American aviator
 Robert Quirk Short (1759–1827), Church of England clergyman
 Robert V. Short (1823–1908), American politician in Oregon
 Robert Short (make-up artist), makeup and visual effects artist